Taupō District is a territorial authority district in New Zealand. It covers 6,333 km² of land, and a further 610 km² of lake area, including Lake Taupō, New Zealand's largest lake, and Lake Rotoaira. The district stretches from the small town of Mangakino in the northwest to the Tongariro National Park in the south, and east into the Kaingaroa Forest. The district's population is largely located in the two main centres, Taupō and Tūrangi.

Local government

The district is governed by Taupō District Council. The vast majority of the district also falls within the jurisdiction of Waikato Regional Council, although parts are within the jurisdiction of the Bay of Plenty Regional Council and Manawatū-Whanganui Regional Council, and a tiny sliver is within the territory of the Hawke's Bay Regional Council.

History
Little is known about early Māori settlement near Taupō, although Ngāti Tūwharetoa have been the main iwi of the area for several hundred years. Major pā were situated at the southern end of the lake, to the west of the modern town of Tūrangi.

Taupo town was founded in 1869 as a garrison town during the New Zealand Wars, but remained small due to the poor volcanic soils of the region. It was not until the 1950s that the region started to develop, with forestry and the construction of the Wairakei geothermal power station.

Population
There are  people in the Taupō urban area,  people in the Tūrangi urban area, and  people in other settlements and in rural areas.

Taupo District had a population of 37,203 at the 2018 New Zealand census, an increase of 4,296 people (13.1%) since the 2013 census, and an increase of 4,785 people (14.8%) since the 2006 census. There were 13,830 households, comprising 18,522 males and 18,681 females, giving a sex ratio of 0.99 males per female. The median age was 41.3 years (compared with 37.4 years nationally), with 7,653 people (20.6%) aged under 15 years, 6,072 (16.3%) aged 15 to 29, 16,404 (44.1%) aged 30 to 64, and 7,077 (19.0%) aged 65 or older.

Ethnicities were 76.4% European/Pākehā, 29.9% Māori, 3.2% Pacific peoples, 4.9% Asian, and 1.8% other ethnicities. People may identify with more than one ethnicity.

The percentage of people born overseas was 16.6, compared with 27.1% nationally.

Although some people chose not to answer the census's question about religious affiliation, 51.9% had no religion, 32.9% were Christian, 5.0% had Māori religious beliefs, 0.8% were Hindu, 0.2% were Muslim, 0.5% were Buddhist and 1.8% had other religions.

Of those at least 15 years old, 4,359 (14.8%) people had a bachelor's or higher degree, and 5,760 (19.5%) people had no formal qualifications. The median income was $30,300, compared with $31,800 nationally. 4,284 people (14.5%) earned over $70,000 compared to 17.2% nationally. The employment status of those at least 15 was that 14,385 (48.7%) people were employed full-time, 4,854 (16.4%) were part-time, and 978 (3.3%) were unemployed.

Image gallery

References

External links

Official Visitor Information Website for the Great Lake Taupō Region